Xibenolol is a beta blocker.

References 

Beta blockers
Antihypertensive agents
N-tert-butyl-phenoxypropanolamines